This is a list of seasons completed by the Denver Dynamite. The Dynamite were a professional arena football franchise, and one of the original four teams in the Arena Football League (AFL). Aside from 1988, in which they were inactive for the season, the Dynamite made the playoffs every season, and won ArenaBowl I, the AFL's first ever ArenaBowl. After the 1991 season, the Dynamite ceased operations. The team played its home games at the now demolished McNichols Sports Arena.

References
General
 

Arena Football League seasons by team
Denver Dynamite (arena football) seasons
Colorado sports-related lists